Gukjeh (also Romanized as Gūkjeh; also known as Būkcheh) is a village in Zavkuh Rural District, Pishkamar District, Kalaleh County, Golestan Province, Iran. At the 2006 census, its population was 1,390, in 288 families.

References 

Populated places in Kalaleh County